Amanita virosa, commonly known in Europe as the destroying angel or the European destroying angel amanita, is a deadly poisonous basidiomycete fungus, one of many in the genus Amanita. Occurring in Europe, A. virosa associates with various deciduous and coniferous trees. The large fruiting bodies (i.e., the mushrooms) appear in summer and autumn; the caps, stipes and gills are all white in colour.

Immature specimens of A. virosa resemble several edible species commonly consumed by humans, increasing the risk of accidental poisoning. Small specimens may resemble the common Portobello mushroom to non-experts, but just one cap of A. virosa is enough to kill an adult human. The symptoms of poisoning generally come several hours afterwards, a fact which makes this fungus even more problematic.  
Along with its geographical namesakes, A. virosa is one of the most poisonous of all known poisonous mushrooms; its principal toxic constituent α-Amanitin damages the liver and kidneys, usually fatally.

Taxonomy and naming
The common name of destroying angel is applied to several all-white species of poisonous Amanita, to this species in Europe and to Amanita bisporigera in eastern North America, and A. ocreata in the west. A. virosa was first collected and described by Elias Magnus Fries in Sweden. Its specific epithet virosa derived from the Latin adjective virōsus 'toxic' (compare virus).

Amanita virosa is very similar to several other species of all-white amanitas known as destroying angels, which has led to confusion over which occurs where. This specific name has been applied to all-white destroying angels occurring in North America, though others propose these all belong to Amanita bisporigera and other rarer species instead. There has been some question over whether Amanita verna is a valid species.

Description
Amanita virosa first appears as a white egg-shaped object covered with a universal veil. As it grows, the mushroom breaks free, though there may be ragged patches of veil at the cap edges. The cap often has a distinctive boss; it is able to be peeled and white, though the centre may be ivory in colour. The crowded free gills are white, as is the stipe and volva. The spore print is white and the spores egg-shaped conical and 7–10 μm long. They stain blue with iodine. The flesh is white, with a taste reminiscent of radishes, and turns bright yellow with sodium hydroxide.

This fungus highlights the danger of picking immature fungi as it resembles the edible mushrooms Agaricus arvensis and  A. campestris, and the puffballs (Lycoperdon spp.) before the caps have opened and the gills have become visible.

The ability to be peeled has been taken as a sign of edibility in mushrooming, which is a potentially lethal mistake in this species. It is unclear why this fungus, which more closely resembles edible species, has been implicated in fewer deaths than the death cap, though its rarity may contribute to this.

Distribution and habitat
Amanita virosa is found in mixed woodland, especially in association with beech, on mossy ground in summer and autumn. Most Amanita species form ectomycorrhizal relationships with the roots of certain trees.

Toxicity

Amanita virosa is highly toxic, and has been responsible for severe mushroom poisonings. Like the closely related death cap (A. phalloides), it contains the highly toxic amatoxins, as well as phallotoxins. Some authorities strongly advise against putting these fungi in the same basket with those collected for the table and to avoid touching them. 

Amatoxins consist of at least eight compounds with a similar structure, that of eight amino-acid rings; they were isolated in 1941 by Heinrich O. Wieland and Rudolf Hallermayer of the University of Munich. Of the amatoxins, α-Amanitin is the chief component and along with β-Amanitin is likely responsible for the toxic effects. Their major toxic mechanism is the inhibition of RNA polymerase II, a vital enzyme in the synthesis of messenger RNA (mRNA), microRNA, and small nuclear RNA (snRNA). Without mRNA essential protein synthesis and hence cell metabolism grind to a halt and the cell dies. The liver is the principal organ affected, as it is the organ which is first encountered after absorption in the gastrointestinal tract, though other organs, especially the kidneys, are susceptible.

The phallotoxins consist of at least seven compounds, all of which have seven similar peptide rings. Phalloidin was isolated in 1937 by Feodor Lynen, Heinrich Wieland's student and son-in-law, and Ulrich Wieland of the University of Munich. Though phallotoxins are highly toxic to liver cells, they have since been found to have little input into the destroying angel's toxicity as they are not absorbed through the gut. Furthermore, phalloidin is also found in the edible (and sought-after) Blusher (Amanita rubescens). Another group of minor active peptides are the virotoxins, which consist of six similar monocyclic heptapeptides. Like the phallotoxins they do not exert any acute toxicity after ingestion in humans.

Treatment
Consumption of Amanita virosa is a medical emergency requiring hospitalization. There are four main categories of therapy for poisoning: preliminary medical care, supportive measures, specific treatments, and liver transplantation.

Preliminary care consists of gastric decontamination with either activated carbon or gastric lavage. However, due to the delay between ingestion and the first symptoms of poisoning, it is commonplace for patients to arrive for treatment many hours after ingestion, potentially reducing the efficacy of these interventions. Supportive measures are directed towards treating the dehydration which results from fluid loss during the gastrointestinal phase of intoxication and correction of metabolic acidosis, hypoglycemia, electrolyte imbalances, and impaired coagulation.

No definitive antidote for amatoxin poisoning is available, but some specific treatments have been shown to improve survivability. High-dose continuous intravenous penicillin G has been reported to be of benefit, though the exact mechanism is unknown, and trials with cephalosporins show promise. There is some evidence that intravenous silibinin, an extract from the blessed milk thistle (Silybum marianum), may be beneficial in reducing the effects of death cap poisoning. Silibinin prevents the uptake of amatoxins by hepatocytes, thereby protecting undamaged hepatic tissue; it also stimulates DNA-dependent RNA polymerases, leading to an increase in RNA synthesis. N-acetylcysteine has shown promise in combination with other therapies. Animal studies indicate the amatoxins deplete hepatic glutathione; N-acetylcysteine serves as a glutathione precursor and may therefore prevent reduced glutathione levels and subsequent liver damage. None of the antidotes used have undergone prospective, randomized clinical trials, and only anecdotal support is available. Silibinin and N-acetylcysteine appear to be the therapies with the most potential benefit. Repeated doses of activated carbon may be helpful by absorbing any toxins that are returned to the gastrointestinal tract following enterohepatic circulation. Other methods of enhancing the elimination of the toxins have been trialed; techniques such as hemodialysis, hemoperfusion, plasmapheresis, and peritoneal dialysis have occasionally yielded success but overall do not appear to improve outcome.

In patients developing liver failure, a liver transplant is often the only option to prevent death. Liver transplants have become a well-established option in amatoxin poisoning. This is a complicated issue, however, as transplants themselves may have significant complications and mortality; patients require long-term immunosuppression to maintain the transplant. That being the case, there has been a reassessment of criteria such as onset of symptoms, prothrombin time (PTT), serum bilirubin, and presence of encephalopathy for determining at what point a transplant becomes necessary for survival. Evidence suggests that, although survival rates have improved with modern medical treatment, in patients with moderate to severe poisoning up to half of those who did recover suffered permanent liver damage. However, a follow-up study has shown that most survivors recover completely without any sequelae if treated within 36 hours of mushroom ingestion.

Research
Amanita virosa extract has antibacterial efficacy against Pseudomonas aeruginosa and Staphylococcus aureus in vitro.  It also has shown inhibitory activity on thrombin.

See also

List of Amanita species
List of deadly fungi

References

Sources

virosa
Deadly fungi
Hepatotoxins
Poisonous fungi
Fungi of Europe